This is a list of the Irish Recorded Music Association's Irish Singles Chart Top 50 number-ones of 2005.

See also
2005 in music

External links
Current Irish Singles Chart – Top 50 Positions

2005 in Irish music
Ireland singles
2005